Georgius Pauli-Stravius or Georg Pauli-Stravius (1593–1640) was a Roman Catholic prelate who served as Auxiliary Bishop of Cologne (1640–1661) and Titular Bishop of Ioppe.

Biography
Georgius Pauli-Stravius was born in Lozzen Cuttecoven, Belgium in 1593 and ordained a priest on 25 Mar 1627.
On 26 Mar 1640, he was appointed during the papacy of Pope Urban VIII as Auxiliary Bishop of Cologne and Titular Bishop of Ioppe.
On 17 Feb 1641, he was consecrated bishop by Franz Wilhelm von Wartenberg, Bishop of Osnabruck, with Wolther Heinrich von Strevesdorff, Titular Bishop of Ascalon, serving as co-consecrators. 
He served as Auxiliary Bishop of Cologne until his death on 7 Feb 1661.

References

External links and additional sources
 (for Chronology of Bishops) 
 (for Chronology of Bishops)  

17th-century German Roman Catholic bishops
Bishops appointed by Pope Urban VIII
1593 births
1661 deaths